The Order of Saint Stanislaus may refer to:

Orders of knighthood
Order of Saint Stanislaus, a Polish order of knighthood founded in 1765, incorporated into the Russian Empire in 1831
 Order of Saint Stanislaus (House of Romanov), a Russian order of knighthood of the House of Romanov constituted in 1831 as an incorporation of the order found in Poland

Orders of merit
Order of Polonia Restituta, a Polish state order founded in 1921

Other uses
Ordo Sancti Stanislai, a Polish self-styled order founded in 1979
International Order of Saint Stanislaus, a Polish fraternal order founded in 2004